Gabriele Berghofer (born 26 June 1963) is an Austrian Paralympic skier and athlete. She represented Austria in alpine skiing, Nordic skiing and athletics at both Winter and Summer Paralympic Games. She won a total of seven medals including one gold, three silver medals and three bronze medals.

Career 
She competed at the 1980 Summer Paralympics. She finished in fourth place in the pentathlon category B, with 4105 points,

She competed at the 1984 Summer Paralympics.  Berghofer won a gold medal in the pentathlon with 2014 points, and a bronze medal in the shot put with the result of 7.35 m (behind Janet Rowley with 9.14 m and Michelle Message with 8.51 m .

At the 1984 Winter Paralympics, Berghofer finished third in the B2 giant slalom with a time of 3:09.74 (in 1st place Vivienne Martin who finished the race in 3: 02.85 and in 2nd place Connie Conley in 3: 09.45). 

At the 1988 Winter Paralympics, in Innsbruck, she won a silver medal in the B2 giant slalom (with a realized time of 2:04.13), and a bronze medal in the B2 category downhill race in 0:54.28 (behind compatriots Elisabeth Kellner in 0: 53.24 and Edith Hoelzl in 0: 54.10  ).

At the 1998 Winter Paralympics, Berghofer also competed in Paralympic Nordic skiing, where she won two silver medals: in the 7.5 km race in the B2-3 category (on the podium, in 1st place Miyuki Kobayashi and in 3rd place Susanne Wohlmacher), and in the relay 3x2.5 km women's open, together with her companions Renata Hoenisch and Elisabeth Maxwald.

References 

1963 births
Living people
Paralympic athletes of Austria
Paralympic alpine skiers of Austria
Austrian female alpine skiers
Austrian female shot putters
Austrian female long jumpers
Austrian female sprinters
Athletes (track and field) at the 1980 Summer Paralympics
Athletes (track and field) at the 1984 Summer Paralympics
Alpine skiers at the 1984 Winter Paralympics
Alpine skiers at the 1988 Winter Paralympics
Biathletes at the 1998 Winter Paralympics
Medalists at the 1984 Summer Paralympics
Medalists at the 1984 Winter Paralympics
Medalists at the 1988 Winter Paralympics
Medalists at the 1998 Winter Paralympics
Paralympic gold medalists for Austria
Paralympic silver medalists for Austria
Paralympic bronze medalists for Austria
Visually impaired shot putters
Visually impaired long jumpers
Visually impaired sprinters
Paralympic shot putters
Paralympic long jumpers
Paralympic sprinters
20th-century Austrian women